Tobias Haslinger (1 March 1787 - 18 June 1842) was an Austrian composer and music publisher. He published works by composers including, among others, Beethoven, Bendel, Mozart, Schubert, Hummel, Weber, Strantz,and Chopin.

References 

1787 births
1842 deaths
19th-century Austrian people
18th-century Austrian musicians
18th-century Austrian male musicians
19th-century Austrian musicians
19th-century Austrian male musicians